Games Republic was a 30-minute TV game show which was broadcast on BSkyB's .tv channel from 1999 to 2000. It had an Egyptian theme and was hosted by Trevor and Simon.

The first round consisted of the 'punch up quiz' in which two contestants battled against each other to get a chance at playing a bronze, silver or gold challenge.  If the contestant won the bronze challenge then on the next show, the contestant would get a chance to play a silver challenge and the same for the gold challenge. For the challenges, a character called 'the Pundit' (a hooded Charlie Brooker) was brought on to give advice to the contestant and to inform the viewers about the game.

The show was criticised by contestants for the lack of research into its questions.  Contestants often questioned the presenters on air regarding answers which were in fact correct but were still given as false.

References

http://www.ukgameshows.com/ukgs/Games_Republic
http://shiftrunstop.co.uk/2010/09/23/episode-45-simon-hickson/
Clip from show with magic from Sussex Magician https://www.youtube.com/watch?v=uL7x0V22JOs

External links

1999 British television series debuts
2000 British television series endings
1990s British children's television series
2000s British children's television series
1990s British game shows
2000s British game shows
Sky UK original programming
English-language television shows